Varjače is a settlement in the Kotor Varoš municipality, in the Republika Srpska entity of Bosnia and Herzegovina.

History
Until 1955, Varjače belonged to the former Previle Municipality, Kotor Varoš.

Population

References

Villages in Bosnia and Herzegovina
Populated places in Kotor Varoš